Castro Valley High School is located in the unincorporated suburban community of Castro Valley, California, United States. It is a State school#United States high school for grades 9 to 12. Named a National Exemplary School in 1984–85 and 1988–89, it was a California Distinguished School in 1987–88, 2000–01, and 2009.

It is part of the Castro Valley Unified School District.

Academics 
CVHS ranks in the top 1,900 public high schools in America, 275th in California, and 49th in the San Francisco Metro Area. 48% of students participate in Advanced Placement courses, and 41% of students passed at least one AP exam. The graduation rate is 97%.

As a comprehensive high school, Castro Valley High School provides a wide variety of course offerings, including advanced, honors, and Advanced Placement courses.

Demographics 
Student enrollment in the 2021–2022 school year was approximately 2,699 students. Their ethnic makeup was:
 30.0% Asian
 25.6% Caucasian
 23.7% Hispanic/Latino
 9.1% Two or more races
 4.8% Filipino
 4.7% African American
 0.6% Native Hawaiian/Pacific Islander
 0.1% American Indian or Alaska Native

Notable alumni 

 Jeff Beal, Emmy Award-winning composer
 Amy Berg, TV writer and producer
 Mike Bordin, drummer for Faith No More
 Brodie Brazil, Emmy Award-winning reporter for Comcast SportsNet Bay Area/Comcast SportsNet California; San Jose Sharks sideline reporter
 Darren Brazil, editor, brother of Brodie
 Cliff Burton, former bassist for Metallica
 Jason Castro, catcher for Minnesota Twins, selected tenth overall in 2008 MLB Draft by Houston Astros
 Randall William Cook, three-time Oscar winner for Best Visual Effects: Lord of the Rings Trilogy, 2001-2003; Class of 1969
 Val Diamond, stage performer; starred in Beach Blanket Babylon in San Francisco, 1979-2009; Class of 1969
 Ryan Fleck, movie director and screenwriter; Half Nelson, Sugar, It's Kind of a Funny Story, and Mississippi Grind; Class of 1994.
 Bob LaPoint, professional water skier; five world slalom titles; Class of 1973
 Kris LaPoint, professional water skier; nine-time National Slalom Champion; Class of 1971.
 Luenell, actress in Borat: Cultural Learnings of America for Make Benefit Glorious Nation of Kazakhstan
 Rachel Maddow, political commentator and television journalist; host of MSNBC's The Rachel Maddow Show
 Jim Martin, former guitarist for Faith No More
 Mark Mastrov, founder of 24 Hour Fitness; partial owner of NBA's Sacramento Kings; Class of c. 1980
 Lourdes Pangelinan, first female director-general of the Secretariat of the Pacific Community.
 Jonas Rivera, producer of Pixar's 2009 movie Up
 Rick Rodriguez, former professional baseball player (Oakland Athletics, Cleveland Indians, and San Francisco Giants)
 Marty Schmidt, mountain climber and guide
 Juan Toscano-Anderson, small forward for the Golden State Warriors
 Brad Wellman, MLB player 1982–1989, Kansas City Royals and San Francisco Giants

References

External links 
 
 The Olympian

High schools in Alameda County, California
Educational institutions established in 1956
Public high schools in California
1956 establishments in California